The Xiyue Temple (西岳庙) is a Chinese Taoist temple located at the foot of the Mount Hua of the city of Huayin in the northwest of the Shaanxi Province. Here the emperor sacrificed to the god of Mount Hua. Its magnificence is compared to that of the Imperial Palace in Beijing and it is called the "Forbidden City of Shaanxi".

History

The temple was built in 134 BC by Emperor Wu of the Western Han Dynasty. The Emperor Wu built the first worship temple of the Emperor Xiyue, the god of the Mount Hua at foot of the mountain, he named the temple Jilinggong Palace. In the following East Han Dynasty the temple was moved to present location and changed the name to Xiyue Temple.

The temple was renovated several times in subsequent dynasties. The current buildings date from the Ming and Qing dynasties. The Xiyue Temple has been on the list of monuments of the People's Republic of China (3-126) since 1988.

References

External links
Xiyue Temple

Chinese architectural history
Religious buildings and structures in Shaanxi
Horses in Chinese mythology
Major National Historical and Cultural Sites in Shaanxi
Huayin